The 1955 Open Championship was held at the Lansdowne Club in London from 23 March - 28 March. Hashim Khan won his fifth consecutive title defeating his younger brother Azam Khan in a repeat of the 1954 final. Hashim Khan equalled the record number of five wins set by F.D. Amr Bey

Seeds

Results

+ amateur
^ seeded

References

Men's British Open Squash Championships
Men's British Open Championship
Men's British Open Squash Championship
Men's British Open Squash Championship
Men's British Open Squash Championship
Squash competitions in London